Montauk Manor is a historic resort hotel located in the hamlet of Montauk in Suffolk County, New York, on Long Island. It was built in 1926 by Carl G. Fisher and is a three-story, 140 decorated condominium apartments in the Tudor Revival style. It was designed by Schultze and Weaver, the firm responsible for several Miami Beach-area hotels, The Breakers in Palm Beach, The Biltmore in Los Angeles, and The Pierre, The Sherry-Netherland and the former Waldorf-Astoria in Manhattan, New York City.

The first floor of the hotel contains a variety of public rooms and service areas.  The second and third floors contain hotel rooms and the attic is generally unfinished. It operates as a 140-apartment resort condominium hotel and was added to the National Register of Historic Places in 1984.

References
Notes

External links

Official website

Hotel buildings on the National Register of Historic Places in New York (state)
Tudor Revival architecture in New York (state)
Hotel buildings completed in 1926
Buildings and structures in Suffolk County, New York
National Register of Historic Places in Suffolk County, New York
1926 establishments in New York (state)